Wolf Creek is a  tributary of the Great Miami River in southwestern Ohio in the United States.  It rises in western Montgomery County, northwest of Brookville, and flows generally southeast, passing through the center of Trotwood and joining the Great Miami in downtown Dayton.

Wolf Creek was named for the frequent wolves seen there in pioneer days.

It was one of the streams that flooded during the Great Dayton Flood of 1913, resulting in the creation of the Miami Conservancy District.

Sycamore Woods State Park, the only state park in Montgomery County, lies along Wolf Creek.  The  park offers horseback riding, hiking, hunting, and group camping.

Location

Mouth: Confluence  with the Great Miami River in Dayton 
Origin: Clay Township, Montgomery County

Other streams
The U.S. Geographic Names Information System (GNIS) lists 16 streams named Wolf Creek in Ohio.

See also
List of rivers of Ohio

References

External links
Sycamore Woods State Park

Rivers of Ohio
Rivers of Montgomery County, Ohio